Events in the year 1947 in Norway.

Incumbents
 Monarch – Haakon VII
 Prime Minister – Einar Gerhardsen (Labour Party)

Events

 7 August – Thor Heyerdahl's balsa wood raft, the Kon-Tiki, smashes into the reef at Raroia in the Tuamotu Islands after a 101-day, 4,300-mile journey across the Pacific Ocean, proving that pre-historic peoples could have traveled from South America.
 28 August – Kvitbjørn disaster: A flying boat of type Short Sandringham named "Kvitbjørn" crashes into a mountain near Lødingen in Norway; all 35 on board (28 passengers and 7 crew) perish.
 Owned by Norsk Hydro between 1912 and 1918, the artificial fertilizer production at Glomfjord is leased back to Hydro by the Norwegian government. This activity is  Yara International. Hydro also buys the power plant.
 Municipal and county elections are held throughout the country.

Popular culture

Sports

Music

Film

Literature
The Norwegian Writers for Children association (Norske Barne- og Ungdomsbokforfattere) is founded.
Nils Johan Rud, novelist, short story writer and magazine editor, is awarded the Gyldendal's Endowment literature prize for the first time

Notable births

January 
2 January – Hans Gjeisar Kjæstad, politician
19 January – Frank Aarebrot, political economist (died 2017).
20 January – Dag Jostein Fjærvoll, politician (died 2021).
24 January – Øystein Sunde, folk singer and guitarist

February 
4 February – Halvor Hagen, American football player
9 February – Ole Paus, singer, author and poet
14 February – Marit Nybakk, politician
20 February – Torstein Dahle, politician and economist
27 February – Johan Elsness, politician

March 
2 March – Steinar Pedersen, politician
4 March – Jan Garbarek, saxophonist
5 March 
Jørg Willy Bronebakk, diplomat
Lorents Lorentsen, civil servant
Ola Didrik Saugstad, pediatrician and professor
7 March – Laila Riksaasen Dahl, bishop
12 March 
Erling Lars Dale, educationalist
Arne Sortevik, politician
15 March – Henning Skumsvoll, politician
16 March – Erling Lae, politician
28 March – Hanne Aga, poet (died 2019).
29 March – Aage Kvalbein, cellist and professor of cello
30 March – Torbjørn Digernes, physicist and professor

April 
4 April – Inger Smuk, politician
9 April – Olav Steinar Namtvedt, politician
11 April – Kristen Fløgstad, triple jumper and long jumper
21 April – Inge Hansen, businessperson
22 April – Anne Brit Stråtveit, politician
23 April – Hugo Parr, physicist.
26 April – Sverre Leiro, businessperson
30 April – Finn Kalvik, singer and composer

May 
6 May – Odd Aalen, statistician and professor
 9 May – Frank Stubb Micaelsen, poet and novelist (d. 2013).
12 May – Tore Eriksen, economist and civil servant
16 May
Kari Gjesteby, politician
Tom Thoresen, politician

June 

8 June – Jan Otto Fredagsvik, politician
10 June – Finn Jarle Sæle, newspaper editor.
11 June – Svein Erik Bakke, entrepreneur (died 2006).
14 June – Karen Margrethe Kuvaas, politician
23 June – Thor Hansen, professional poker player (died 2018).
27 June – Tron Øgrim, journalist, author and politician (died 2007).
28 June – Bjørn Simensen, culture administrator and former journalist

July 
 
3 July 
Rolf Erling Andersen, politician
Grethe Kausland, singer, performer and actress (died 2007).
5 July 
Astrid Bekkenes, politician
Sigurd Frisvold, Chief of Defence
18 July – Berit Unn Johansen, figure skater.
24 July – Svein Rennemo, businessperson
26 July – Kristian Helland, politician
28 July – Kjell Øvergård, politician

August 
4 August – Halvar Hansen, politician
12 August – Ole Henrik Magga, linguist and politician
20 August – Per Ravn Omdal, president of the Norwegian Football Association
23 August – Terje Rypdal, guitarist and composer

September 

1 September – Jan Jakob Tønseth, author, poet and translator
3 September – Kjell Magne Bondevik, Prime Minister
12 September – Bjørn Floberg, actor
19 September – Knut Karlberg, veterinarian
21 September – Åge Tovan, politician
23 September – Morten Strand, soccer player and politician
24 September – Erik Hivju, actor
25 September – Torhild Staahlen, operatic mezzo-soprano
27 September – Svein Kvia, international soccer player (died 2005).
28 September – Gustav Lorentzen, singer-songwriter (died 2010).

October 

10 October – Håkon Helgøy, politician
11 October – Sigmund Kroslid, politician
14 October – Per Otto Furuseth, handball player, coach and administrator.
19 October – Gunnar Staalesen, writer
26 October – Eli Hagen, secretary.
31 October – Gunhild Elise Øyangen, politician

November 
3 November – Tor Svendsberget, biathlete
5 November – Eyvind Skeie, priest and author
18 November – Øyvind Stene, engineer and businessperson
19 November – Finn Tveter, rower, Olympic silver medallist and jurist (died 2018).
22 November – Terje Rød-Larsen, diplomat and sociologist
24 November – Eva Lundgren, feminist scholar and sociologist

December 
 

5 December – Jørgen Kosmo, politician (died 2017).
18 December
Einar Olav Skogholt, politician
Sten Stensen, speed skater and Olympic gold medallist
29 December – Odd-Arne Jacobsen, musician

Full date unknown
Håvard Kjærstad, businessperson
An-Magritt Jensen, sociologist
Kai Paulsen, journalist, photographer and computer collector (died 2002)
Johan Vold, businessperson

Notable deaths
1 January – Paul Benjamin Vogt, politician (born 1863)
12 February – Ragnhild Kåta, first deaf-blind person in Norway to receive proper schooling (born 1873)
10 March – Ole Wehus, Nazi collaborator and torturer, executed (born 1909)
8 April – Olaf Frydenlund, rifle shooter and Olympic silver medallist (born 1862)
22 April – Einar Dønnum, Nazi collaborator, executed (born 1897)
30 April – Yngvar Bryn, track and field athlete and pairs figure skater (born 1881)
24 May – Øistein Schirmer, gymnast and Olympic gold medallist (born 1879)
28 June – Per Steenberg, organist and composer (born 1870)
1 August – Harald Natvig, rifle shooter and Olympic gold medallist (born 1872).
15 September – Øistein Jakobsen, politician (born 1907)
15 October – John Johansen, sprinter (born 1883)
18 October – Johan Cappelen, jurist and politician (born 1889)
21 October 
Torger Baardseth, bookseller and publisher (born 1875)
Per Larssen, politician (born 1881)
23 October – Sigurd Christiansen, novelist and playwright (born 1891)
3 November – Embrik Strand, arachnologist (born 1876)
20 November – Magnus Nilssen, politician (born 1871)

Full date unknown
Per Lysne, Rosemaling artist (born 1880)

See also

References

External links